Ryōgoku Kajinosuke may refer to:

Ryōgoku Kajinosuke I (1874–1949), sumo wrestler, komusubi
Ryōgoku Kajinosuke II (1892–1960), sumo wrestler, sekiwake
Ryōgoku Kajinosuke III (1907–1959), sumo wrestler, sekiwake
Ryōgoku Kajinosuke IV (born 1962), sumo wrestler, komusubi